HTP Winward Motorsport also known as Team Mann-Filter, HTP Motorsport and Winward Racing is a German-American-based auto racing team. The team mainly competes in GT3 based series such as the GT World Challenge Europe. The team was founded after HTP Investment BV took over Heico Motorsport.

History

Background
Wim de Pundert was one of the founders of HTP Investment BV. Along with Klaas Meertens the duo bought, managed and sold various companies starting in 1990. The private equity company became more Germany focused when it acquired the Knaus Tabbert caravan manufacturers, Morelo Reisemobile caravan manufacturers and the Halberg-Guss foundry. It also owned Reum Kunststoff- und Metalltechnik GmbH which was sold to Grammer Interior Components in 2015.

Early beginnings
The racing team was founded in 2007 when father Wim and son Reynier de Pundert bought two Formula Gloria tube framed single-seaters. Reynier finished 8th in the amateur championship. The team returned the following season with Reynier winning the championship while Wim run only a partial season. In 2008 the team also fielded Christiaan Frankenhout in the international Gloria Scouting Cup where he finished third. After the demise of the short-lived single-seater series, the team entered the Dutch Renault Clio Cup for 2009, 2010 and 2011. During the seasons Reynier de Pundert did not score a podium finish in the overall classification. In 2009 the team also joined Dutch GT4 with an Aston Martin Vantage for Junior Strous. Strous won one race and scored four podium finishes.

Team HEICO Motorsport

Automotive tuning company Heico Sportiv ran racing cars since 1995. The German Volvo tuning company first entered a Volvo 850 in the 24 Hours of Nürburgring. The racing of various Volvo's ended in 2001 when the owners of Volvo, Premier Automotive Group, ended all customer and factory supported racing activities. Heico Sportiv restarted the racing programme for Volvo's, which were in-house developed, in 2007. The team focused on fuel efficiency with diesel and biofuel.

In late 2010 the team acquired two Mercedes-Benz SLS AMG GT3. The team eventually entered three SLS AMG's in the 2011 ADAC GT Masters. Austrians Dominik Baumann and Harald Proczyk were the best placed Heico Motorsport drivers. Baumann and Proczyk scored four podium finishes placing them fifth in the series championship. Baumann also competed in the 2011 FIA GT3 European Championship with teammate Brice Bosi. At Circuit Paul Ricard the team scored the first ever GT3 race win for an SLS AMG. Heico Motorsport continued in 2012 winning the team championship in the FIA GT3 European Championship. Working with Charouz Racing System Baumann and Maximilian Buhk won the team championship.

HTP Motorsport

HTP Investment BV has had sponsorship agreements with Heico Motorsport since the team entered GT3 racing in 2011. HTP Investment BV took over Heico Motorsport at the beginning of 2013. Heico Motorsport team principal Norbert Brückner remained as the principal of the new team. Winning the 2013 24 Hours of Spa and the following 1000km of the Nürburgring this was enough for Buhk to secure the 2013 Blancpain Endurance Series championship. HTP Motorsport won the In 2014 the best result for HTP Motorsport in the Blancpain Endurance Series was a second place at the Nürburgring. The team was more successful in the 2014 ADAC GT Masters. Maxi Buhk and Maxi Götz won at Oschersleben and EuroSpeedway Lausitz. Götz won the 2014 Blancpain Sprint Series with HTP Motorsport.

The team switched manufacturer for the 2015 racing season. In December 2014 it was announced that Bentley selected HTP Motorsport to run one of their factory supported GT3 programs. The team entered five new Bentley Continental GT3 cars. The Blancpain Endurance Series was unsuccessful with a new driver line up failing to provide results. A ninth place at the 2015 24 Hours of Spa for Vincent Abril, Mike Parisy and Harold Primat was the team's best result in the Endurance Series. Abril partnered with Buhk in the 2015 Blancpain Sprint Series winning two qualifying races and two main races. Along with four more podium this was enough to secure the drivers championship. Fellow HTP Motorsport driver Jules Szymkowiak also won the Silver Cup classification. In the 2015 ADAC GT Masters the team won a single race with Luca Stolz and Jeroen Bleekemolen winning at Oschersleben.

The cooperation with Bentley lasted only one season. The team returned to Mercedes-Benz for 2016. The team entered four cars, in the Blancpain GT Series and at the 24 Hours of Nürburgring. The team opted not to continue in the ADAC GT Masters. Team owner Wim de Pundert also returned to the racing seat in the gentleman driver based 2016 Blancpain GT Sports Club. The return to Mercedes-Benz also meant new factory drivers joined the team such as Indy Dontje, Thomas Jäger and Christian Hohenadel. Former Mercedes-Benz factory drivers also returned such as Buhk and Baumann. Buhk and Baumann, joined by Jazeman Jaafar, won a single race at Silverstone in the newly introduced Mercedes-AMG GT3. In 2017 the team also returned to the ADAC GT Masters, but without notable results. In the Blancpain GT Endurance Cup Buhk, joined by Jimmy Eriksson and Franck Perera scored three podium finishes placing them third in the drivers championship.

HTP Motorsport was one of the teams selected by AMG Customer Racing to test the Mercedes-AMG GT4 in the 2017 Touring Car Endurance Series. Debuting at Circuit de Spa-Francorchamps, Dontje, Bernd Schneider and Jörg Viebahn suffered technical difficulties after running at the front early in the race.

Winward Racing

In 2020 the German team HTP Motorsport and the US-American team Winward Racing became HTP Winward Motorsport after they started a successful partnership in 2017. Since then they had already entered Mercedes AMG GT4 cars in the Michelin Pilot Challenge. HTP Winward Motorsport is now the biggest Mercedes-AMG customer team.

HTP Junior Team

When the ADAC Formel Masters transformed into the ADAC Formula 4 (in accordance with FIA Formula 4 regulations), HTP Motorsport entered three Tatuus F4-T014 cars. The team was run by Brückner and former HWA Team CEO Gerhard Ungar. Marvin Dienst and Jenneau Esmeijer raced the full 2015 season while Carrie Schreiner ran a partial season. Dienst won eight races and clinched the championship, while Esmeijer settled for seventh. At the end of 2015 Ralf Schumacher took over the role from Brücker renaming the team US Racing, ending the involvement from HTP Motorsport in ADAC Formula 4.

Results

Deutsche Tourenwagen Masters

24 Hours of Nürburgring
(key) (Races in bold indicate pole position) (Races in italics indicate fastest lap)

ADAC Formula 4

In detail
(key) (Races in bold indicate pole position) (Races in italics indicate fastest lap)

Timeline

Gallery

References

Auto racing teams established in 2013
German auto racing teams
ADAC GT Masters teams
2013 establishments in Germany
Blancpain Endurance Series teams
WeatherTech SportsCar Championship teams
Deutsche Tourenwagen Masters teams
American auto racing teams
International GT Open teams
Mercedes-Benz in motorsport